Toin Adams, born in Kitwe, Zambia, is a sculptor working in steel, acrylic, fibreglass and other media. She spent her early childhood in eastern Rhodesia (now Zimbabwe), and late teen years, in South Africa, where she attended the National School of the Arts, Johannesburg. In the late 80's she moved to England, where she began her career in sculpting.

"I like making large scale sculpture, playing with diverse materials and figuring out how to make them...not fall over..."

Adams is part of The Imaginary Beings Art Collective, a group of artists that work together to create collaborative art projects. Through this collective she has put together several art events around the world including The End of a World and Transcendence and Transformation.

Notes

Zambian people of British descent
Zambian people of English descent
Zambian emigrants to South Africa
Zambian expatriates in the United Kingdom
Living people
People from Kitwe
Zambian sculptors
Year of birth missing (living people)